James Tompkins may refer to:

Jimmy Tompkins (priest) (1870–1953), Canadian Roman Catholic priest 
Jimmy Tompkins (footballer) (1914–1944), English footballer
James Tompkins (Australian rules footballer), Australian rules footballer for Port Adelaide

See also
 James Tomkins (disambiguation)